Marilyna meraukensis, known as the Merauke toadfish, is a species of pufferfish in the family Tetraodontidae. It is a tropical brackish-water species known from New Guinea and northern Australia, where it occurs in mangrove estuaries and tidally influenced sections of rivers. It reaches 19 cm (7.5 inches) SL.

References 

Tetraodontidae
Fish described in 1955